Hanyang University Station is a station on the Seoul Subway Line 2. This partially underground station lies within the Hanyang University campus, and is located in Haengdang-dong, Seongdong-gu, Seoul.

Station layout

References

Seoul Metropolitan Subway stations
Railway stations opened in 1983
Metro stations in Seongdong District
Hanyang University
1983 establishments in South Korea
20th-century architecture in South Korea